José Daniel Guccione (7 February 1952 – 26 February 2021) was an Argentine politician and physician.

Biography
He was a Deputy from 2011 to 2015. He died from COVID-19 during the COVID-19 pandemic in Argentina, nineteen days after his 69th birthday.

References

Members of the Argentine Chamber of Deputies elected in Misiones
1952 births
2021 deaths
21st-century Argentine politicians
Deaths from the COVID-19 pandemic in Argentina